Diamond Inya Palace is a residential building located on the northern side of the Inya Lake in Yangon, Myanmar. Although its exact height is not publicly known, the 34-story condominium is widely considered to be the tallest building in Myanmar. The 376-unit condominium was completed and opened in 2019.

During construction in 2016, with 26 stories completed, the building came under review by the Yangon Region Government for exceeding the height limit in the then draft zoning plan. The building apparently was grandfathered in, and allowed to proceed. In any case, the developer of the building, MGW, has not publicly revealed the exact height of the building to date.

References

Buildings and structures in Yangon